Cakebread may refer to:

People
 Dennis Cakebread (born 1938), former English athlete
 Gerry Cakebread (1936-2009), English footballer
 Jane Cakebread (1830-1898), domestic worker and inebriate; the Inebriates Act 1898 was directly due to her case
 Peter Cakebread, British game designer

Other
 Cakebread Cellars, an American winery in Napa Valley
 Cakebread & Walton, a British games company